TWC may refer to:

Organizations
 Taiwan Water Corporation, a water utility company in Taiwan
 Taylor Woodrow Construction, a British-based construction company, now part of Taylor Wimpey
 Tech Workers Coalition, an international labor rights group seeking to organize the tech industry
 Tennessee Wesleyan College, a liberal-arts college in Athens, Tennessee
 Texas Workforce Commission, a governmental agency in the U.S.
 Time Warner Cable, an American cable telecommunications company that existed from 1992 until its 2016 purchase by Charter Communications
 Trans World Communications, the investment vehicle of businessman Owen Oyston
 The Weather Company (Australian company), now known as Weatherzone, an Australian meteorological service provider
 The Weinstein Company, an American film studio
 Trans World Connection, an American former airline, affiliate of Trans World Airlines (TWA)

Technology
 Three-way catalyst, key component of catalytic converters

Media
 The Weather Channel, an American cable and satellite television network
 The Weather Channel (Australia), now Sky News Weather Channel, an Australian cable and satellite channel
 The Weather Cast, a short-lived television channel seen exclusively on Dish Network
 The Wordsworth Circle, an academic journal
 The Wrestling Channel, later The Fight Network, a defunct free-to-air digital satellite television sports channel in the United Kingdom and Ireland
 The Wacken Carnage, a live CD/DVD set by the death metal band Bloodbath released in 2008
 Age of Empires III: The WarChiefs, the first official expansion pack for the real-time strategy game Age of Empires III 
 The White Council, in J. R. R. Tolkien's legendarium
 Transformative Works and Cultures, peer-reviewed open access academic journal

Other uses
 Time Warner Center, a pair of skyscrapers in New York City
 Track warrant control, a traffic control method on secondary U.S. railroads
 Trade working capital, in business finance, the difference between current assets and current liabilities related to the everyday operations of a company
 Traditional Wing Chun Kung Fu, a style of the Chinese martial art
 Tumxuk Airport, IATA code TWC